Diktel Rupakot Majhuwagadhi is a Municipality in Khotang District of Province No. 1 of Nepal. The municipality was established in May 2014 merging some existing VDCs: Bamrang, Laphyang and Kahalle as Diktel Municipality.

Diktel was renamed to Rupakot Majhuwagadhi on 10 March 2017 after merging some more VDCs. The municipality is divided into 15 wards. It is on 700 m to  2250 m of elevation from sea level. The area of the municipality is 246.51 km2. There are 10,050 households with population of 46,903. By 2020, the name commonly used name Diktel was re-added to the municipality's official name.

Transportation  
Man Maya Airport lies in Old-Diktel offering flights to Kathmandu.

Media 
To promote local culture, Diktel has two community radio stations: Halesi FM (102.4 MHz) and Rupakot Radio (105.0 MHz).

References

External links

UN map of the municipalities of Khotang District

Populated places in Khotang District
Khotang District
Nepal municipalities established in 2014
Municipalities in Koshi Province
Municipalities in Khotang District